Hardendale is a hamlet in the parish of Shap Rural in the Eden District, in the county of Cumbria, England, near Shap and junction 39 of the M6 motorway. It is also near the hamlet of Oddendale.

References

Hamlets in Cumbria
Eden District